Leucospermum patersonii is a large evergreen, upright shrub of up to  high that is assigned to the family Proteaceae. From the center of each flower emerges a long orange style with a thickened tip that is bent to the center of the head, giving the entire head the appearance of a pincushion. It is called silveredge pincushion in English. Flowers can be found between August and December. It is an endemic species limited to the south coast of the Western Cape province of South Africa.

Description 
The flowering stems are upright, woody,  in diameter, densely covered in short fine cringy hairs and some straight, spreading hairs.

The lobes in the middle part (or claws), where the perianth is split lengthwise, curve back on their base when the flower opens, and is densely woolly hairy.

Differences with related species 
The silveredge pincushion differs from its relatives by the tree-like habit (shared with L. conocarpodendron), large, roundish leaves with three to eight teeths, the middle part of the flower woolly hairy, and the skewed, spinning-top shaped pollen presenter.

Taxonomy 
The silveredge pincushion had been collected by some of the earliest plant collectors, among which excellent specimens collected by Oldenland, who was master gardener in service of the Dutch East India Company at the Cape up until the year 1697. Johannes Burman and J.C.D. von Schreber had these specimens in their herbarium collections, but filed them as L. conocarpodendron, and their distinctiveness was overlooked for over two hundred years. After it was collected again in 1922 by a Mr. H.W. Paterson who, lived in Hermanus, it was scientifically described for the first time by Phillips in 1928. He named it Leucospermum patersonii, in the collector's honor. No other scientific names for this species exist.

L. patersonii has been assigned to the showy pincushions, section Brevifilamentum.

Distribution, habitat and ecology 
L. patersonii can be found between Cape Agulhas in the east along the coast to Stanford, with an outlying population at Heuningklip Kloof, near Kleinmond. It also used to occur near Hermanus but went extinct there. The silveredge pincushion is a species of the coast that is almost restricted to limestone ridges next to the sea between  altitudes. Except for the population at Heuningklip Kloof, the species grows on limestone of the Alexandria Formation. In roots mostly penetrating the system soft layers of limestone closer to the surface. The silveredge pincushion usually grows in fairly dense stands in a vegetation that also contains other Proteacea with a preference for limestone, including Mimetes saxatilis, Protea obtusifolia and Leucadendron meridianum. Mature plants are able to regenerate from the tips of the branches, if the periodic wildfires that periodically occur in the fynbos are not too hot.

Cultivation 
The upright habit and large conspicuous flower heads make L. patersonii attractive as a cut flower and ornamental species. Because it is adapted to lime, it is used to make hybrids that can grow on a range of soil types. Several such hybrids have been developed by crossing L. patersonii with L. conocarpodendron, which is itself intolerant of lime.

References

External links 
 several photos

patersonii
Endemic flora of South Africa
Plants described in 1928